Monumental Funk is a studio album by the rock band Grand Funk Railroad. It was released in 1974 on Quadico (QLP-7401).

Mark Farner calls this a "bootleg" put out by the people at the original label who released music by Terry Knight & the Pack, a company called Lucky Eleven.

Track listing
 "We Gotta Have Love" (Mark Farner)  - 4:11
 "Hey Everybody" (Jerry Tuttle)   - 3:37
 "I've Got News for You" (Dick Wagner)  - 4:47
 "Come See About Me" (Holland-Dozier-Holland)  - 4:16
 "Harlem Shuffle" (Bob Relf, Earl Nelson)  - 5:22
 "Love Lights" (Joseph Wade Scott, Deadric Malone)  - 7:06

Personnel
Mark Farner – guitar, harmonica, keyboards, vocals
Don Brewer – drums, vocals

Grand Funk Railroad albums
1974 albums